The City of Leadville is a statutory city that is the county seat, the most populous community, and the only incorporated municipality in Lake County, Colorado, United States. The city population was 2,602 at the 2010 census and an estimated 2,762 in 2018. Leadville is the highest incorporated city in the United States and it is surrounded by two of the tallest 14,000 foot peaks in the state.

Leadville is a former silver mining town that lies among the headwaters of the Arkansas River within the Rocky Mountains. The Leadville Historic District, designated a National Historic Landmark in 1961, contains many historic structures and sites of Leadville's mining era. In the late 19th century, Leadville was the second most populous city in Colorado, after Denver.

History

Settlement

The Leadville area was first settled in 1859 when placer gold was discovered in California Gulch during the Pikes Peak Gold Rush. Prospectors panned for gold in the stream that ran through California Gulch in what became the town of Oro City (oro is the Spanish word for gold). Horace Tabor, who became known as the "Leadville Silver King", and his wife Augusta were among the first prospectors to arrive in Oro City. His wife made money as postmistress, banker, cook, and laundress while Tabor was a prospector.

The early miners had noted that mining for placer gold was hampered by heavy black sand in the sluice boxes, and in 1874 it was discovered that the heavy sand that impeded gold recovery was the lead mineral cerussite, which has a high silver content. Prospectors traced the cerussite to its source, present day Leadville, and by 1876 had discovered several silver-lead lode deposits. As the gold has been tapped out of the gulch and attention was averted to nearby Leadville, a mile or two away, Oro City became a ghost town.

Founding of Leadville

Leadville was founded in 1877 by mine owners Horace Tabor and August Meyer at the start of the Colorado Silver Boom. The town was built on desolate flat land below the tree line. The first miners lived in a rough tented camp near the silver deposits in California Gulch. Initially, the settlement was called "Slabtown", but when the residents petitioned for a post office, the name "Leadville" was chosen. By 1880, Tabor and Meyer's new town had gas lighting, water mains,  of streets, five churches, three hospitals, six banks, and a school for 1,100 students. Many business buildings were constructed with bricks hauled in by wagons. 

In early 1878, Meyer, along with Leadville's pioneer smelter entrepreneur, Edwin Harrison, after whom the famed Harrison Avenue is named,  and Tabor established a post office in Leadville, with Henderson as postmaster. The post office and the telegraph office both prospered.

The town's first newspaper was The Reveille, a Republican weekly, in 1878. Three months later, a competing Democratic weekly, The Eclipse, emerged. The Chronicle was the town's first daily and first newspaper in America to employ a full-time female reporter. Like the Rocky Mountain News, The Chronicle took the lead in outing criminals and thieves, in an attempt to clean up the town's shady business culture. Despite violent threats, the Chronicle survived without major incident.

William Nye opened the first saloon in 1877, and it was followed by many others. The same year the Coliseum Novelty was the first theater to open. It offered sleeping rooms upstairs for a nightly rate and provided a variety of entertainments: dancing girls, dogfights, cockfighting, wrestling and boxing matches, and rooms for gambling. In June 1881, it burned to the ground. Ben Wood, who arrived in Leadville in 1878, opened the first legitimate theater, Wood's Opera House, with a thousand seats. It was a first-class theater, where gentleman removed their hats and did not smoke or drink in the presence of a lady. Less than a year later, Wood opened the Windsor Hotel. His opera house was regarded as the largest and best theater constructed in the West, an honor it held until the opening of the Tabor Opera House. Horace Tabor's Opera House was the most costly structure in Colorado at the time. Building materials were brought by wagons from Denver. The massive three-story opera house, constructed of stone, brick, and iron, opened on November 20, 1879. Tabor, originally from Vermont, became the town's first mayor. After striking it rich, he had an estimated net worth of 10 million dollars and was known for his extravagant lifestyle.

In 1883, Horace Tabor divorced his wife of 25 years and married Baby Doe McCourt, who was half his age. Tabor was by then a US senator, and the divorce and marriage caused a scandal in Colorado and beyond. For several years, the couple lived a lavish lifestyle in a Denver mansion, but Tabor, one of the wealthiest men in Colorado, lost his fortune when the repeal of the Sherman Silver Purchase Act caused the Panic of 1893. He died destitute but remained convinced that the price of silver would rebound. According to legend, he told Baby Doe to "hold on the Matchless mine... it will make millions again when silver comes back." She returned to Leadville with her daughters, Silver Dollar and Lily, where she spent the rest of her life believing Tabor's prediction. At one time the "best dressed woman in the West", she lived in a cabin at the Matchless Mine for the last three decades of her life. After a snowstorm in March 1935, she was found frozen in her cabin, aged about 81 years.

Mining and smelting

Mining in the Leadville area began in 1859 when prospectors discovered gold at the mouth of California Gulch. In 1876, black sand, once considered bothersome to placer gold miners, was discovered to contain lead carbonates, leading to a rush of miners to the area and the founding of the town in 1877. By 1880, Leadville was one of the world's largest and richest silver camps, with a population of more than 15,000. Income from more than thirty mines and ten large smelting works produced gold, silver, and lead amounting to $15,000,000 annually.

According to one historian of the era, "The outpouring of the precious metal from Leadville transformed the struggling Centennial State into a veritable autocrat in the colony of states. As if by magic the rough frontier town of Denver became a metropolis; stately buildings arose on the site of shanties; crystal streams flowed through the arid plains and the desert blossomed and became fruitful. Poverty gave way to the annoyance of wealth and the fame of silver state spread throughout the world."

Swindles were not uncommon in the mining community. When the Little Pittsburg mine was exhausted of its rich ore body, its managers sold their shares while concealing the mine's actual condition from the other stockholders. "Chicken Bill" Lovell dumped a wheelbarrow load of silver-rich ore into a barren pit on his Chrysolite claim in order to sell it to Horace Tabor for a large price. Tabor had the last laugh when his miners dug a few feet farther and discovered a rich ore body. Some time later the manager of the Chrysolite mine fooled an outside mining engineer into overestimating the mine's ore reserves.

The city's fortunes declined with the repeal of the Sherman Silver Purchase Act in 1893, although afterwards there was another small gold boom. Mining companies came to rely increasingly on income from the lead and zinc. The district is credited with producing over 2.9 million troy ounces of gold, 240 million troy ounces of silver, 1 million short tons of lead, 785 thousand short tons of zinc, and 53 thousand short tons of copper.

A bitter strike by Leadville's hard rock miners in 1896–97 led to bloodshed, at least five deaths, and the burning of the Coronado Mine. In a letter to a London business contact, mine owner Eben Smith wrote, "The strikers got the worst of it in the raid on the Coronado and Emmet [mines], there were 10 or 12 killed; we do not know how many, and a great number wounded; they take care of their wounded the same as the Indians but every now and then a fellow turns up that the rats have been eating or who has gone to decay that we know must have been shot ..."

World War II caused an increase in the demand for molybdenum, used to harden steel. It was mined at the nearby Climax mine, which at one time produced 75 percent of the world's output. By 1980, the Climax Mine was the largest underground mine in the world. Taxes paid by the mine provided Leadville with good schools and libraries and provided employment for many residents. When the market dropped in 1981, Leadville's economy suffered and many people lost their jobs. With little industry other than the tourist trade, most of the former miners left, and the standard of living declined. Climax reopened in 2008 and started production in 2010. It currently is the most efficient mine producing molybdenum in Colorado and is estimated to have a production life of thirty years.

The many years of mining left behind substantial contamination of the soil and water and the Environmental Protection Agency designated some former mines Superfund sites, such as California Gulch.  As of 2019, the EPA reports:  "A vast majority of the cleanup at the site has been completed, so current risk of exposure is low. Pregnant women, nursing mothers and young children are still encouraged to have their blood-lead levels checked."

Leadville's colorful past

As the population boomed, by 1878, Leadville had the reputation as one of the most lawless towns in the West. The first city marshal was run out of town a few days after he was appointed, and his replacement was shot dead within a month by one of his deputies. Fearing the town would be lost to the lawless element, Mayor Horace Tabor sent for Mart Duggan, who was living in Denver, as a replacement. Duggan is little-known today, but was well known at the time as a fearless gunfighter. Using strong-arm and lawless tactics, during his two stints as marshal, Duggan brought order to Leadville by 1880 when he stepped down. He was shot and killed in 1888 by an unknown assailant, most likely an enemy he had made when he was a Leadville marshal. Historian Robert Dearment writes, "Mart Duggan was a quick-shooting, hard-drinking, brawling tough Irish man, but he was exactly the kind of man a tough, hard-drinking, quick-shooting camp like Leadville needed in its earliest days. His name is all but forgotten today, but the name "Matt Dillon" is recognized around the world. Such are the vagaries of life."

Alice Ivers, better known as Poker Alice, was a card player and dealer of the Old West who learned her trade in Leadville. Born in Devonshire, her family moved to America when she was a small girl. They first settled in Virginia, where she attended an elite girls' boarding school. When she was a teenager, her family moved to Leadville when the silver boom drew hundreds of new residents to the area. At the age of twenty she married a mining engineer who, like many of the men at that time, frequented the numerous gambling halls in Leadville. Alice went along, at first just observing, but eventually she began to sit in on the games as well. After a few years of marriage her husband was killed in a mining accident and she turned to cards to support herself. Alice was attractive, dressed in the latest fashions, and was in great demand as a dealer. Eventually Alice left Leadville to travel the gambling circuit, as was common of the male gamblers of that time. She continued to dress in the latest fashions but took to smoking cigars. Well known throughout the West, gambling halls welcomed her because she was good for business. Alice said that she won more than $250,000 by gambling during her lifetime.

Texas Jack Omohundro, Confederate scout, cowboy and stage actor with "Buffalo Bill" Cody's travelling revue, died of pneumonia a month before his 34th birthday in summer 1880 in Leadville, where he was living on a small estate with his wife, ballerina Giuseppina Morlacchi.

Around 1883, shortly after the gun fight at the O.K. Corral, Doc Holliday moved to Leadville, where he dealt faro. On August 19, 1884, he shot ex-Leadville policeman Billy Allen, who had threatened him for failing to pay a $5 debt. Despite overwhelming evidence implicating him, a jury found Holliday not guilty of the shooting or attempted murder.

Gunfighter and professional gambler Luke Short also spent time in Leadville.

Margaret "Molly" Brown, who became known as "The Unsinkable Molly Brown", moved to Leadville when she was 18. In 1886 she married a mining engineer who was twelve years older, James Joseph Brown. The Brown family acquired great wealth in 1893 when Brown was instrumental in the discovery of a substantial gold ore seam at the Little Jonny Mine.

The mine was owned by his employers, the Ibex Mining Company. A 1960 Broadway musical based on her life was produced, along with a 1964 film adaptation of the musical, both titled The Unsinkable Molly Brown. Her home in Denver has been preserved as the Molly Brown House Museum.

Meyer Guggenheim of the Guggenheim family started out in Leadville in mining and smelting. The family went on to possess one of the largest fortunes in the world. Family members have become known for their philanthropy in diverse areas such as modern art and aviation, including several Guggenheim Museums.

Oscar Wilde appeared at the Tabor Opera House during his 1882 American Aesthetic Movement lecture tour. The reviews were mixed, and the press satirized Wilde in cartoons as an English dandy decorated with sunflowers and lilies, the floral emblems of the Aesthetic Movement. A Kansas newspaper described the event:

Oscar Wilde's visit to Leadville excited a great deal of interest and curiosity. The Tabor-opera house where he lectured was packed full. It was rumored that an attempt would be made by a number of young men to ridicule him by coming to the lecture in exaggerated costume with enormous sunflowers and lilies and to introduce a number of characters in the costume of the Western "bad men". Probably, however, better counsel prevailed and no disturbance took place.

Mayor David H. Dougan invited Wilde to tour the Matchless Mine and name its new lode "The Oscar". Wilde later recounted a visit to a local saloon, "where I saw the only rational method of art criticism I have ever come across. Over the piano was printed a notice – 'Please do not shoot the pianist. He is doing his best.'"

Post-mining era

The town has made major efforts to improve its economy by encouraging tourism and emphasizing its history and opportunities for outdoor recreation. The National Mining Museum and Hall of Fame opened in 1987 with a federal charter. The town's altitude and rugged terrain contributes to a number of challenging racing events, such as the Leadville Trail 100 series of races. It is often used as a base for altitude training and hosts a number of other events for runners and mountain bicyclists.

Geography

The surrounding peaks are all well above 12,000 feet, and are thus bare of trees. Leadville has the highest elevation of any city in the United States. 

Leadville lies in a valley at the headwaters of the Arkansas River which flows through the southern Rocky Mountains and eventually empties into the Mississippi River. It is situated between two mountain ranges, the Mosquito Range to the east and the Sawatch Range to the west, both of which include several nearby peaks with elevations above , the so-called fourteeners. An ultra-prominent  fourteener, Mount Elbert is the highest summit of the Sawatch Range and the second-highest summit in the contiguous United States after Mount Whitney in California.

Turquoise Lake lies on the western outskirts of Leadville. The surface available for recreation includes . Turquoise Lake is a feature of the Fryingpan-Arkansas Project. Recreation is managed by the Forest Service for the Bureau of Reclamation as part of San Isabel National Forest.

The lower part of California Gulch runs past the southern edge of the city, flowing west  to the Arkansas River.

Climate
Leadville has an alpine subarctic climate (Dfc) with cold winters and mild summers, bordering on a cold semi-arid climate (Bsk). There are an average of 271.7 mornings annually with freezing temperatures, which can occur in any month of the year.

Demographics

As of the census of 2000, there were 2,821 people, 1,253 households, and 675 families residing in the city. The racial makeup of the city was 83.52% White, 0.14% African American, 1.28% Native American, 0.32% Asian, 0.11% Pacific Islander, 12.34% from other races, and 2.30% from two or more races. Hispanic or Latino of any race were 25.45% of the population.

There were 1,253 households, out of which 24.7% had children under the age of 18 living with them, 40.7% were married couples living together, 8.5% had a female householder with no husband present, and 46.1% were non-families. 35.0% of all households were made up of individuals, and 9.2% had someone living alone who was 65 years of age or older. The average household size was 2.23 and the average family size was 2.91.

In the city, the population was spread out, with 22.1% under the age of 18, 12.1% from 18 to 24, 34.4% from 25 to 44, 22.0% from 45 to 64, and 10.4% who were 65 years of age or older. The median age was 34 years. For every 100 females, there were 109.1 males. For every 100 females age 18 and over, there were 107.8 males.

The median income for a household in the city was $36,714, and the median income for a family was $44,444. Males had a median income of $28,125 versus $23,512 for females. The per capita income for the city was $20,607. About 9.1% of families and 13.3% of the population were below the poverty line, including 18.5% of those under age 18 and 7.5% of those age 65 or over.

Historic sites and districts

The Leadville Historic District was designated a National Historic Landmark District in 1961. The district encompasses 67 mines east of the city up to the  elevation, and a defined portion of the village area, with specific exclusions for various buildings. The principal historic buildings are the Tabor Grand Hotel, St George's Church, Temple Israel, the Annunciation Church, Tabor Opera House, City Hall, Healy House, Dexter Cabin, Engelbach House, and Tabor House, as well as mining structures and small homes.

The National Mining Hall of Fame on West 9th Street is dedicated to commemorating the work of miners and people that work with natural resources. It is listed on the National Register of Historic Places.  Major exhibits include an elaborate model railroad, a walk-through replica of an underground hardrock mine, the Gold Rush Room with specimens of native gold, a large collection of mineral specimens, and a mining art gallery. The site also includes the Matchless Mine and cabin, former home of Baby Doe Tabor.

Some historic sites are linked by the Mineral Belt National Recreation Trail, an  all-season biking/walking trail that loops around Leadville and through its historic mining district. In part it follows old mining-camp railbeds. Interpretative kiosks recount the history and a photograph of what was on that particular site more than a century ago. The trail is well-marked with interpretive signs and altitude and mileage markers.

It was a U.S. Army ski warfare training facility constructed in 1942 for what became the 10th Mountain Division. Some of the nation's finest skiers were employed as instructors. Soldiers were trained in mountain climbing, Alpine and Nordic skiing, and cold-weather survival, as well as various weapons and ordnance. When it was in full operation, approximately 15,000 soldiers were housed there. As the only source of recreation for the trainees, Leadville was persuaded to change its moral character, perceived "to be on a rather low plane" at the time. Today Camp Hale is designated as a National Historic Site offering a self-guiding tour with interpretive signs at ten stops and a larger interpretive site at the main entrance.

 north of Leadville the old downhill training slope, Cooper Hill, located atop Tennessee Pass on the Continental Divide, now operates as the Ski Cooper resort. Much of the area is above the tree line, providing a panoramic view of the peaks of the Sawatch Range to visitors. A memorial to troops of the 10th Mountain Division is located at the summit.

Culture and sport

Boom Days, held on the first full weekend of August, is a tribute to the city's mining past. The event has been honored by Congress as a Local Legacy Event. The festivities held over three days include mining competitions and burro racing, motorcycle games, a rod and gun show, live music, a craft fair and parade. The annual skijoring event and Crystal Carnival take place in March. This is a horse-drawn skiing for the family since the 1960s. The town has frequent, sometimes small parades held in the downtown area, such as the quirky St Patrick's Day Practice Parade.

The Leadville Trail 100, an ultramarathon, takes place each August on an out-and-back course on trails around Turquoise Lake, over Hagerman Pass, the Colorado Trail, through Twin Lakes, across the Arkansas River, up and over Hope Pass, to the ghost town of Winfield. It then returns along the same course.

Five access points offer opportunities to walk shorter sections: Ice Palace Park, Lake County Middle School, Dutch Henry Hill, California Gulch, and the East 5th Street Bridge. Mineral Belt is completely ADA-accessible for wheelchairs and strollers, cyclists, runners and in-line skaters.

The "Route of the Silver Kings" is a driving tour of the  historic mining district. The tour passes mines, power plants, ghost towns and mining camps.

Outdoor recreation

Situated within the San Isabel National Forest and surrounded by three wilderness areas, Leadville is popular with hikers and campers. The Mount Massive Wilderness and Buffalo Peaks Wilderness are within  of the city, and the Collegiate Peaks Wilderness is within .

Turquoise Lake lies on the western outskirts of Leadville. Recreation facilities consist of eight campgrounds and two boat-launching ramps. The surface available for recreation includes . Primary recreation activities include camping and fishing. Fish species include mackinaw trout, rainbow trout, and brook trout. The facilities are closed in winter due to ice and snow, but they remain a popular area for ice fishing. Turquoise Lake is part of the Fryingpan-Arkansas Project. Recreation is managed by the Forest Service for the Bureau of Reclamation as part of the San Isabel National Forest.

The Top of the Rockies Byway, designated a National Scenic Byway in 1998, is a highway that travels  starting in Aspen and traveling through Leadville to either Minturn or Copper Mountain. The Top of the Rockies Byway runs through three national forests: Pike, Arapaho, and White River. The Camp Hale Memorial is located along the byway, where soldiers trained on skis to fight in the Apennine Mountains of Italy during World War II. The road passes through the Arkansas Headwaters Recreation Area and Arkansas River Headwaters State Park.

It can be traversed only on foot, an off-road motorcycle, or with a proper four-wheel drive vehicle. It is typically passable only during the summer months.

Transportation

Leadville is served by Lake County Airport. However, there is no scheduled airline service available from this airport.

Highways
 US 24 is an east–west highway running from Interstate 75 near Clarkston, Michigan, to Interstate 70 near Minturn, Colorado. It is the main route to the Eagle-Vail valley to the northwest and Colorado Springs,  to the southeast.
 State Highway 91 is a  highway that connects Leadville with Interstate 70 near Copper Mountain.

Railways

 In 1880, the Denver & Rio Grande Railway opened a  narrow-gauge railway branch from Malta,  to the west. Third rail was added in 1888, and from 1940 it was only standard gauge. The last  were abandoned by Union Pacific in 1998. This severed the connection between the Leadville, Colorado & Southern Railroad and the rest of the railroad system. The remaining three miles from Malta have not seen any traffic in many years.
 In the past, D&RG operated branch lines from Leadville to Oro City (1883-1941), Ibex/Chrysolite (1898-1944), Graham Park (1898-1941) and Fryer Hill (1881-1944). Another branch run over Fremont Pass as far as Robinson, Wheeler, and Dillon (1881/2-1923).
 The former Colorado & Southern Railway line from Leadville to Climax is now operated as a tourist line by the Leadville, Colorado & Southern Railroad.
 In 2010, rail and coach commuter service was proposed between Minturn and Dotsero, in 2012 from Leadville to Vail and Dotsero with intermediate stations at Minturn, Avon, Eagle and Gypsum.

See also
Denver, South Park and Pacific Railroad
Leadville Historic District
Leadville Mining District
Mount Elbert
Mount Massive
Twin Lakes, Colorado

References

"Leadville: The Struggle to Revive An American Town" by Gillian Klucas p. 21
Conant Graff, Marshall. A History of Leadville, Colorado. 1920.
Scanlon, Gretchen. A History of Leadville Theatre: Opera Houses, Variety Acts and Burlesque Shows. 2012.
Kent, Lewis A. Leadville: The City. Mines and Bullion Product. Personal Histories of Prominent Citizens, Facts and Figures Never Before Given to the Public. 1880.
"Holliday Bound Over to Appear at the Criminal Court in the Sum of Eight Thousand Dollars." Leadville Daily Herald. August 26, 1884. (p.4)

Further reading
 Plazak, Dan. A Hole in the Ground with a Liar at the Top . Includes a chapter on mining in early Leadville.

External links

 City of Leadville official website
 CDOT map of Leadville
 Visit Leadville
 Leadville photos and information at Western Mining History
The Mines and Minerals of Leadville, Mineralogical Record, volume 16, May-June, 1985. 
 Temple Israel Synagogue and Museum

Cities in Colorado
County seats in Colorado
Mining communities in Colorado
Populated places established in 1877
Cities in Lake County, Colorado
Colorado populated places on the Arkansas River
1877 establishments in Colorado